William Platt Jencks (August 15, 1927 – January 3, 2007) was an American biochemist.  He was noted particularly for his work on enzymes, using concepts drawn from organic chemistry to understand their mechanisms.

Career

Jencks graduated from Harvard College in 1947 with a degree in English, and earned a Doctor of Medicine from Harvard University in 1951.  He interned at the Peter Bent Brigham hospital.  Jencks conducted his first postdoctoral research for two years with Fritz Lipmann at Harvard Medical School.  Jencks was drafted into the Army Medical Corps and was assigned to the Army Medical Service Graduate School at Walter Reed Medical Center in Washington, DC.  He worked with E. L. Durrum and served as the chair of the department of pharmacology.  In 1956–1957, he did a second Public Health Service postdoc with R. B. Woodward of the Harvard University Department of Chemistry.  In 1957, he moved to the new graduate program in biochemistry at Brandeis University.  He became professor emeritus in 1996.

Much of his career focused on reaction mechanisms used by enzyme catalysts. He was particularly well known for studies of the reaction of nucleophiles with carbon. He proposed that enzymes use ground state destabilization, termed the Circe Effect, to increase the reactivity of their bound substrates. Many of these research interests were explored in his influential text Catalysis in Chemistry and Enzymology. Jencks published close to 400 scientific papers during his career.

Jencks was a co-founder of the biannual Winter Enzyme Mechanisms Conference.  He was memorialized at the 20th Enzyme Mechanisms Meeting in St. Pete Beach, Florida, several days after his death.

Honors and awards

Jencks was a recipient of the 1962 American Chemical Society Eli Lilly Award in Biological Chemistry, the 1993 American Society of Biological Chemists Award, the 1995 American Chemical Society James Flack Norris Award in Physical Organic Chemistry, and the 1996 American Chemical Society Repligen Corporation Award in Chemistry of Biological Processes. He was elected to the National Academy of Sciences in 1971.  Jencks was also a foreign member of the Royal Society and a member of the American Philosophical Society.

Personal life

Jencks's father, Gardner Jencks, was a pianist and composer.  Jencks attended the Calvert School, and completed high school from St. Paul's School near Baltimore.  After his first year at medical school, he did research with George Wald at the Marine Biological Laboratory at Woods Hole on lobster shell pigments.  At Woods Hole, he met his future wife, Miriam Ehrlich. Jencks was survived by Miriam, his wife of 56 years, children Sara and David, grandson Benjamin, and siblings Charles Jencks (b. 1939) a landscape architect, Penelope Jencks-Hurwitz, and John Cheetham.

Selected bibliography

References

External links
National Academy of Sciences Biographical Memoir

1927 births
2007 deaths
Members of the United States National Academy of Sciences
American biochemists
Harvard Medical School alumni
Foreign Members of the Royal Society
Harvard College alumni
Members of the American Philosophical Society
People from Bar Harbor, Maine